The Salt River First Nation is a Dene First Nations band government in the Northwest Territories. The band is headquartered in the town of Fort Smith.

In April 2019, the First Nation opened a new $16.7M business and conference center in Fort Smith, resembling the shape of the First Nation's land when viewed from above.

References

First Nations in the Northwest Territories
Dene governments